Husky Pass is a pass between the Lanterman Range and Molar Massif in the Bowers Mountains of Victoria Land, Antarctica, located at the head of Sledgers Glacier and an unnamed tributary, leading to Leap Year Glacier. This mountain pass was so named by the New Zealand Geological Survey Antarctic Expedition, 1963–64, for the great efforts made here by dog teams in hauling out of the Rennick Glacier basin into that of Lillie Glacier. The pass lies situated on the Pennell Coast, a portion of Antarctica lying between Cape Williams and Cape Adare.

Further reading 
  J. A. S. Dow & V. E. Neall (1974), Geology of the Lower Rennick Glacier, Northern Victoria Land, Antarctica, New Zealand Journal of Geology and Geophysics, 17:3, 659–714, https://doi.org/10.1080/00288306.1973.10421588 PP 683, 686
 Antarctic Journal of the United States, Volume 29, Issue 5, P 26
 G. DI VINCENZO, R. PALMERI, F. TALARICO, P. A. M. ANDRIESSEN AND C. A. RICCI, Petrology and Geochronology of Eclogites from the Lanterman Range, Antarctica, JOURNAL OF PETROLOGY VOLUME 38 NUMBER 10 PAGES 1391–1417 1997

External links 

 Husky Pass on USGS website
 Husky Pass on the Antarctica New Zealand Digital Asset Manager website
 Husky Pass on SCAR website
 Husky Pass area satellite image

References 

Mountain passes of Victoria Land
Pennell Coast